The Tindastóll women's basketball team, commonly known as Tindastóll, is the women's basketball department of the Ungmennafélagið Tindastóll sport club and is based in Sauðárkrókur, Iceland. As of the 2018–2018 season, it plays in the 1. deild kvenna.

History
Tindastóll played in the top-tier Úrvalsdeild kvenna from 1992 to 1996 and again during the 1999-2000 season, making the playoffs in 1994 and 2000.

Trophies and awards

Titles 
Division I (2):
1998, 1999

Awards
Úrvalsdeild Women's Young Player of the Year
 Birna Eiríksdóttir – 2000

1. deild Foreign Player of the Year
 Tessondra Williams – 2019

1. deild Domestic All-First team
 Bríet Lilja Sigurðardóttir – 2015

Notable players

 Birna Eiríksdóttir
 Birna Valgarðsdóttir
 Inga Dóra Magnúsdóttir
 Kristín Elfa Magnúsdóttir

Coaches
 Kári Marísson 1992–1996
 Jill Wilson 1999–2000
 Arnoldas Kuncaitis 2018–2019
 Árni Eggert Harðarson 2019–present

References

External links

Ungmennafélagið Tindastóll basketball
Sauðárkrókur